Retamim is a kibbutz in the central Negev desert in southern Israel. Located three kilometres northwest of Revivim, it falls under the jurisdiction of Ramat HaNegev Regional Council.

History
The community was founded by a group of demobilised IDF soldiers and new immigrants who started to gather in kibbutz Be'eri in 1978. A second group was established in Revivim in early 1979. The two groups merged in mid-1979 and moved to a caravan site opposite what is now Park Golda after Tlalim had moved to its permanent site in December 1979.

However, due to lack of support from the Kibbutz Movement, the kibbutz did not expand, and the movement acted to evict the members, some moved to Revivim others to other kibbutzim and the rest to the towns, until eventually only one of the original members remained

In 1983 the kibbutz was finally established on its present site, assisted by Nahal soldiers from the Hebrew Scouts. In 1994 it united with kibbutz Revivim after suffering from social problems and members leaving. Some of its houses were converted into a holiday village called Rotem BeMidbar, though this closed in 2000. It now serves as an immigrant absorption centre catering largely for immigrants from Ethiopia.

References

Kibbutzim
Kibbutz Movement
Populated places established in 1983
Populated places in Southern District (Israel)
1983 establishments in Israel
Ethiopian-Jewish culture in Israel